Victor Christoffer Jensen (born 8 February 2000) is a Danish professional footballer who plays as a winger for Eredivisie club Utrecht.

Club career

Ajax
On 2 June 2017, 17-years old Jensen officially signed for Ajax from FC Copenhagen's youth sector. Jensen would join the club's U19 squad on 1 July due to his young age. Copenhagen sold Jensen for about €3.5 million which made him the most expensive player ever under 18 to be sold from Denmark. In October 2017 Jensen was also nominated by The Guardian to the list of the 60 biggest talents born in 2000. 

In his first season at Ajax, he played 27 games for the U19 squad, scoring 6 goals. He also made his way to Jong Ajax making his Eerste Divisie debut for Jong Ajax on 12 January 2018 in a game against Fortuna Sittard. From the 2018–19 season, he became a permanent part of the Jong Ajax squad.

Jensen made his first team debut on 11 January 2019 in a friendly game against Brazilian club Flamengo.

Jensen made his Eredivisie debut for Ajax on 12 December 2020 in a game against PEC Zwolle as a 75th-minute substitute for Antony.

Loan to Nordsjælland
On 1 February 2021, Jensen was sent on a six-month loan to Danish Superliga club Nordsjælland. He made his debut for the club on 4 February against Brøndby which ended in a 1–0 loss.

Loan to Rosenborg
On 1 March 2022, it was announced that Jensen had extended his contract with Ajax until 2024, while undergoing his second loan spell, this time with Norwegian Eliteserien side Rosenborg BK, until the end of the year.

Utrecht 
On 31 January 2023, Jensen officially joined Eredivisie side Utrecht on a permanent deal, signing a contract until June 2026 with the club.

References

External links
 Career stats - Voetbal International
 
 

Living people
2000 births
Danish men's footballers
Association football wingers
Denmark youth international footballers
Denmark under-21 international footballers
Footballers from Copenhagen
People from Hvidovre Municipality
F.C. Copenhagen players
Hvidovre IF players
Jong Ajax players
AFC Ajax players
FC Nordsjælland players
Rosenborg BK players
FC Utrecht players
Eredivisie players
Eerste Divisie players
Danish Superliga players
Eliteserien players
Danish expatriate men's footballers
Danish expatriate sportspeople in the Netherlands
Danish expatriate sportspeople in Norway
Expatriate footballers in the Netherlands
Expatriate footballers in Norway